María Gabriela Espino Rugero (born November 15, 1977), better known as Gaby Espino, is a Venezuelan actress, model and presenter. She is best known for her roles in telenovelas.

Early life and career
Born in Maracay, Venezuela, Gaby Espino is the daughter of a chemical engineer and a publicist. She is of Spanish, Native Venezuelan and Lebanese descent. Her parents divorced when she was young. She is the oldest of five children, she has a sister, Andreina, two paternal half-brothers, Gustavo and Mariano and a maternal half-sister, Nelly.

Due to her fascination with animals, she originally planned to become a veterinarian. She later decided to study dentistry, but changed her mind and began studying public relations, before deciding to become an actress.

Personal life
Gaby Espino married Venezuelan actor Cristobal Lander on June 14, 2007. On July 9, 2008, they welcomed a daughter named Oriana Lander.

During the filming of Mas Sabe el Diablo in 2009, Espino was linked to her co-star, Jencarlos Canela. In early 2010, Espino and Lander separated and it was rumored that it was because Canela was dating Espino on the side. Canela and Espino denied this and stated they were just friends.

Espino reconciled with Lander in November 2010, but they later divorced in March 2011 and once again rumors suggested that Canela and Espino were dating.

In September 2011, Canela and Espino did a live chat over social networking site Twitter, where they confirmed they were in relationship and announced that they were expecting their first child together. The godparents are Cristina Saralegui and Pitbull. Espino gave birth to their son, Nickolas Canela Espino, on February 12, 2012. On August 26, 2014 both Canela and Espino confirmed on their official Facebook page that they have decided to put an end to their relationship.

Filmography

Films

Television

Awards and nominations

References

External links

 
 Official "El Rostro de Analía" website 
 Telemundo website

1977 births
Living people
People from Maracay
Venezuelan film actresses
Venezuelan telenovela actresses
Venezuelan television actresses
Venezuelan female models
Venezuelan people of Lebanese descent
Venezuelan expatriates in the United States
Venezuelan Roman Catholics